Sense Scotland is a national charity and specialised social care provider in Scotland, formalized in 1985. The charity’s aim is to support people with communication support needs associated with complex and sensory disabilities, and their families, and put their individual needs and choices first. Services are located all over Scotland with the charity’s main resource centre and head office based in Glasgow. The charity also provides information about complex communication support needs and participates in disability rights campaigns. 
Sense Scotland’s work is mainly funded by Local Government through contracts for services provided. It also raises money through donations, legacies, community fundraising, events, retail and corporate partnerships.

History
Sense Scotland was formalised as a charity in 1985, and opened its first office and charity shop in Glasgow the following year. The charity began supporting people with communication support needs in Glasgow in 1987, before opening services in Fife, Dundee, Lanarkshire and Ayrshire throughout the 1990s and 2000s. 

On 11 June 2011, Sense Scotland announced that former MSP Andy Kerr had been appointed as CEO. He took over from interim CEO Joyce Wilson who held the position after former Chief Executive Gillian Morbey OBE left to head Sense and Sense International in October 2010.  Morbey has been instrumental in setting up Sense Scotland and became its first staff member in 1985. She received an OBE in 1995 for her service to the deafblind community.

In November 2011, Sense Scotland was awarded best UK health project at the National Lottery Awards, recognizing the difference that projects (co)financed by the Big Lottery Fund make to local communities, and celebrate the achievements of the people behind them.

In 2012, Sense Scotland launched Partners in Communication, an inclusive communication programme. The following year, the charity launched its Early Years programme to support families with children aged up to eight years old.

In 2020, the charity celebrated its 35th anniversary. In 2022, Angela Bonomy was appointed as CEO.

Activities

Support Services
The charity offers support services to children, young people and adults with complex communication needs throughout their lives. Sense Scotland’s services include day care, short breaks, supported living, housing support, skill development, arts and outdoor sessions and social clubs. The charity also supports young people and their families to plan for transition from school to adult life.

Advice & Information Services
Sense Scotland's Family Advisory team provides information and support to families on a wide range of topics including education, benefits and funding. They support families to create an emergency plan for the person they care for and signpost them to organisations to help with guardianship and power of attorney. The team offers a range of parent and carer workshops to raise awareness of rights and the rights of the person cared for, and to explore issues including puberty, independence and understanding behaviour.

Sense Scotland also offer advice and training to families and external organisations regarding Inclusive communication, including information on communication aids, technology and apps.

Research, Practice, Learning and Development 
Using evidence-based research, Sense Scotland aims to improve the practice of care staff and those working within the sector, publishing research on a range of topics including deafblindness and communication. As a registered SVQ centre, Sense Scotland provides comprehensive online and in-person training programmes to ensure quality and promote career development.

Influencing Public Policy
Core to the work of Sense Scotland is making sure the people they work with are informed of government policy and help them understand what policies mean to them. The charity is also committed to ensure the thoughts and views of people with disabilities are heard by the Scottish government.

Partnerships
Sense Scotland works in partnership with other organizations. The charity is a member of Disability Benefits Consortium (DBC) together with more than 50 national organizations that represent the needs of people who rely on disability benefits. Sense Scotland is also a member of the Disability Agenda Scotland together with Capability Scotland, Enable Scotland, RNIB Scotland, Action on Hearing Loss and Scottish Association for Mental Health. The charity is a major backer of The Hardest Hit campaign organized jointly in 2012 by DBC and UK Disabled People’s Council to fight the cuts to disability benefits.

Social Enterprising
In April 2008 Her Royal Highness The Princess Royal opened TouchBase Glasgow, a £4.5m development that transformed a derelict warehouse on the South Side in Glasgow into a modern, fully accessible conference, support and community venue. The resource centre is the home of Sense Scotland head office and offers a café open to the public, day care and arts facilities to people with disabilities and a business centre with conference, training and meeting rooms for hire. All income generated through TouchBase Glasgow goes directly towards the charity’s work. Further TouchBases have been opened since 2008 in Lanarkshire, Ayrshire, Fife and East Dunbartonshire.

Fundraising
Sense Scotland is mainly funded by Local Government contracts, accounting for 82% of their income, the other 18% is made up of donations (11%), profit from the retail division (6%) and investment income (1%).

The charity organizes fundraising events all year round for individuals and groups to join. In 2010 The Stand Comedy Club in Glasgow started organizing an annual benefit night in aid of the work of Sense Scotland.

Shops Division
Sense Scotland has a charity retail division that consists of 15 shops throughout Scotland. The charity opened their first shop on Dumbarton Road at Kelvinhall Subway Station in Glasgow in 1986 where it still opens its doors to trade most days of the week.

Sense Scotland shops are predominantly staffed by volunteers and each shop has its own paid shop manager and shop assistant. The shops division is highly dependent on donations of used goods from the public and sells second hand furniture in selected stores. Sense Scotland invites donors of goods to Gift Aid their donations allowing the charity to get extra money by claiming the tax back from the Government.

See also
Sense Scotland's website
Sense for Deafblind People
The Tipping Point Report - The human and economic costs of cutting disabled people's support

References

External links
Sense Scotland Website

Charities for disabled people based in Scotland